Karl Watts Gransden (24 February 192525 July 1998) was a British poet and an editor, translator, scholar, and teacher of Latin and English literature. He spent his career at the British Museum and the University of Warwick.

Life
K. W. Gransden (called "Ken" by his friends) was born in Herne Bay, Kent and, following a period in the military, attended the City of London School and Jesus College, Cambridge, where he studied classics. He married Antonia, a scholar of medieval English history, in 1956. The couple had two daughters and separated in 1977, though he continued to be cited as her husband at the time of her death.

Career
From 1951 to 1957, Gransden worked in the manuscript department at the British Museum. He left the museum to pursue a career as a poet, writer, and literary socialite, but soon returned to academia. In 1965, he was one of four founders of the Department of English and Comparative Literature at the University of Warwick, where he helped to create a department with young scholars such as Germaine Greer and Antony Easthope. Students and colleagues took note of his friendship with E.M. Forster, whose authorized biography Gransden had written; he had a similar role as critic and friend of Angus Wilson. He was later the first department chair of the Classics department, and taught both there and in English until his retirement in 1991. Gransden continued throughout this time to write poetry and to foster the careers of younger poets, including as a longtime judge for the Eric Gregory Award and coeditor of the Gregory Anthology.

Writings
While at the British Museum, Gransden was a regular contributor to The British Museum Quarterly, documenting recent acquisitions in modern and earlier manuscripts. His expertise in ancient and Renaissance literature as well as his own experience as a poet and member of the English literati allowed him to comment in detail on the significance of the Museum's holdings. He analysed the collections of Dylan Thomas's abandoned early experiments in "social realism"; letters from writers such as D.H. Lawrence and Katherine Mansfield acquired along with the papers of the considerably less well-known S.S. Koteliansky; and the "political manœuvrings" revealed by the Museum's enormous cache of Medici Family documents.

Gransden turned toward poetry shortly after leaving the Museum. His first book of poems, Any Day, was not universally well received: one reviewer contextualizes it within "some backwash of the forties" and finds Gransden "rather young to be so dated." His only other book of poetry was a chapbook of fifteen poems published by Peter Scupham's small fine-press, Mandeville, in 1981, in a limited edition of 250 copies. Gransden was never primarily a poet, but he gained respectability among those who were, and Philip Larkin included his "An Interview" in The Oxford Book of Twentieth Century English Verse. His connections to other writers proved more fruitful than his own creative work, none more so than E.M. Forster, who recommended Gransden's book about him most among the many that were published in the last decade of Forster's life. 

In addition to modern literature by older writers in his circle, the subjects of Gransden's early work were primarily poets of the English Renaissance, including John Donne and Edmund Spenser. It was only after 1970 that he turned to the commentary on Latin poetry, particularly Virgil, that would ultimately be his most influential work. His primary analytical work on Virgil, an account of the narrative techniques of the second half of the poem (which Gransden thought of as "Iliadic") from the perspective of a modern reader, has a somewhat uncomfortable relationship to classical scholarship of the time (and classicists were quick to note Gransden's background in English literature). His lasting legacy comes from his commentaries for students, including separate commentaries on Books VIII and XI of the Aeneid and a student guide to the whole poem, all for Cambridge University Press, and the anthology of Virgilian translation in English he prepared for Penguin. Gransden's "sensitivity to the tonality and rich implications of Vergil," gained from decades of work on the poet, was found to be apparent in the anthology. A series of journal articles throughout this period extended Gransden's work on Virgil's debt to Greek poets and his influence on English ones, such as an article that pursues the topic of the sacking of Troy from its earliest fragmentary mentions through the Aeneid and on to Shakespeare's Othello and beyond. Gransden's breadth of interests and skills make him most at home, ultimately, as a comparatist.

Selected works
John Donne. New York: Longmans, Green, 1954. 
Any Day: Poems. London: Abelard-Schuman, 1960. 
E. M. Forster. New York: Grove, 1962. Edinburgh: Oliver and Boyd, 1962. 
Tennyson: In Memoriam. London: E. Arnold, 1964. 
Angus Wilson. New York: Longmans, Green, 1969. 
A Critical Commentary on Spenser's "The Faerie Queene." London: Macmillan, 1969. 
Tudor Verse Satire (editor). London: Athlone, 1970. 
Aeneid, Book VIII (editor). London: Cambridge University Press, 1976. 
The Last Picnic. Hitchin: Mandeville, 1981. 
Virgil's Iliad: An Essay on Epic Narrative. Cambridge: Cambridge University Press, 1984. 
Virgil: The Aeneid (students' guide). Cambridge: Cambridge University Press, 1990, reprinted 2004. 
Aeneid, Book XI (editor). Cambridge: Cambridge University Press, 1991. 
Virgil in English (editor). London: Penguin, 1996.

References 

1925 births
1998 deaths
20th-century English poets
Academics of the University of Warwick
Alumni of Jesus College, Cambridge
Employees of the British Museum
English biographers
English classical scholars
English literary critics
People educated at the City of London School